Mohammad Al-Sahariar (born April 23, 1978), also known as Al-Sahariar Rokon and Al Sahariar, is a Bangladeshi Test and one-day cricketer.

Al Sahariar scored Bangladesh's first first-class century, in their third match in the New Zealand Shell Conference in 1997–98. He was one of the original eleven Bangladeshi Test cricketers, playing in Bangladesh's inaugural Test against India in November 2000. He played 15 Tests, but patchy form led to his exclusion from the team to tour the West Indies in 2003; he played no further Tests or One-day internationals.

Al Sahariar, widely known as "Rokon" was a powerful hitter of the ball and an immensely gifted batsman. But like most of the young Bangladeshi players at the time, he was a bit uncertain at that stage – which ball to play and which to let go – because on Bangladesh wicket you are just playing everything. By nature he possessed some quality shots in his pocket, which gave the distinction. Often he was seen smashing the ball all around when his teammates were struggling in dealing with the same kind of delivery.

Later in his life he moved to New Zealand and represented Hawke's Bay in the Hawke Cup. He returned to Bangladesh to play for Cricket Coaching School in the Dhaka Premier Division limited-overs competition in 2011–12. Al Sahariar moved into New Zealand with his wife (Pinky Mahjabin Sahariar), three-year-old son (Sameer Al Sahariar), and was expecting a daughter to join their family later that year (Naisa Simran Sahariar).

Career highlights
Test debut: Only Test, Bangladesh vs. India, Dhaka, November 2000.
Highest Test score: 71 vs. South Africa, East London, October 2002.
ODI debut: Bangladesh vs. Pakistan, Dhaka, March 1999.
Highest ODI score: 62 not out vs. West Indies, Dhaka, October 1999.

References

External links
 
 Al Sahariar at CricketArchive

1978 births
Bangladeshi cricketers
Bangladesh One Day International cricketers
Bangladesh Test cricketers
Cricketers at the 2003 Cricket World Cup
Dhaka Metropolis cricketers
Living people
Cricketers from Dhaka
Brothers Union cricketers
Victoria Sporting Club cricketers
Cricket Coaching School cricketers
Dhaka Division cricketers